Bouyiourdi (Greek: Μπουγιουρντί) is a Greek appetizer. It consist of feta, kasseri, tomatoes, oregano, olive oil and peppers. The ingredients are baked together in an oven at 200–225 °C (392–437 °F).

It can be served with pita bread.

References

Greek cuisine